Cesare Hercolani (1499–1534) was an Italian condottiero, or mercenary leader.

He was born in Forlì (Northern Italy) in 1499. The Hercolanis were a noble family, and Cesare became a venture captain under Charles V, Holy Roman Emperor.

In the Battle of Pavia (1525), Hercolani injured the horse of Francis I of France, which enabled the Imperial Spanish forces to capture Francis alive and ended the battle.  Hercolani was hailed as the "victor of the battle of Pavia."

In 1534 Hercolani was killed in Forlì by members of the Guelph faction, in vengeance of his action against Francis I of France.

References

1499 births
1534 deaths
People from Forlì
Military leaders of the Italian Wars
Italian untitled nobility
16th-century condottieri